Yvette Lewis may refer to:
 Yvette Lewis (athlete)
 Yvette Lewis (politician)